Lake Skegemog, formerly known as Round Lake and Skegemog Lake, is a lake in Northern Michigan. At the tripoint of Antrim, Grand Traverse, and Kalkaska counties, Lake Skegemog is attached to Elk Lake and is considered to be part of the Elk River Chain of Lakes. The lake is well known for its nature and beauty, along with its fishing.

Geography 
The name 'Skegemog' is an Algonquin word which means "the meeting of the waters".

It is part of the Elk River Chain of Lakes, a  waterway consisting of 14 lakes and connecting rivers which empty into Lake Michigan. The lake's primarily inflow is the Torch River, bringing in water from Torch Lake and elsewhere in the Chain of Lakes. The lake is connected at the west to Elk Lake, and through Elk Lake, water outflows through the short Elk River. The Elk River then empties into the East Arm of the Grand Traverse Bay, itself a bay of Lake Michigan.

The lake contains many stumps and logs in it which provides a nice living area for many species of fish. In addition, much of the surrounding land around the lake is covered in a swamp.

Fishing 
The Lake is home to many species of wild fish including muskellunge, walleye, brown trout, largemouth bass, smallmouth bass, rock bass, northern pike, yellow perch and crappie.

See also
List of lakes in Michigan

References

External links
 

Lakes of Michigan
Lakes of Antrim County, Michigan
Lakes of Grand Traverse County, Michigan
Lakes of Kalkaska County, Michigan